Heraldry of the World (HOTW or Heraldry-wiki.com; formerly NGW, for the original Dutch name Nederlandse GemeenteWapens (Dutch civic heraldry)) is an Internet-based heraldic resource. Its principal project is the Internet's largest website devoted to civic heraldry, containing comprehensive information about all kinds of coats of arms of (local) government authorities, including countries, states, provinces, colonies, regions, districts, cities, towns,  and municipalities worldwide. In addition to these, the site also has a large literature and reference list and a section on heraldic collector items. Since 2017 also Corporate, Institutional, Military and Ecclesiastical heraldry has been added. Since 2018 the site has a new URL as heraldry-wiki.com.

The site started as a single-person private Dutch-language site on Dutch civic heraldry in 1996, and expanded rapidly to cover all countries in the world as "International civic heraldry", the present name was adopted in 2010. The main language changed to English and only the Dutch part is still largely in Dutch. The site is maintained by the webmaster, but the number of contributors is much larger. To facilitate contribution by others the site was transferred since 2010 to a wiki-environment. It still is largely a single-person effort, with 3 editors only.

Website 
The total number of pages on the website is nearly 160,000 and the number of images over 253,000, making it the largest website of its kind.

A very large part of the civic heraldry images used on Wikipedia originates from the site, which is accepted as long as the appropriate template is used.

Coat of arms 
The site uses a logo based on the now obsolete arms of Aasiaat municipality in Greenland, showing a spider web, which is an appropriate symbol for a website.

See also 
 Heraldry by country

References

External links 
 Main Site
 Literature list

Internet properties established in 1995
Internet resources on heraldry
Renkum
Online databases